The Democratic Congressional Campaign Committee (DCCC) is the Democratic Hill committee for the United States House of Representatives, working to elect Democrats to that body.  The DCCC recruits candidates, raises funds, and organizes races in districts that are expected to yield politically notable or close elections. The structure of the committee consists, essentially, of the Chairperson (who according to current Democratic Caucus rules is a fellow member of the caucus appointed by the party leader in the House), their staff, and other Democratic members of Congress that serve in roles supporting the functions of the committee.

The Chairperson of the DCCC is the sixth-ranking position among House Democrats, after the Speaker, the Majority Leader, the Majority Whip, the House Assistant Democratic Leader, and the Democratic Caucus Chairperson. The current chair is Suzan DelBene of Washington, who assumed the position in 2023.

History 

The DCCC originated in 1866 as the Democratic National Congressional Committee.

Due to the reform of campaign finance legislation that took effect in the 2004 election cycle, the DCCC splits into two organizations a few months before each Election Day:

 One organization (the "Coordinated" campaign) can continue to stay in contact with the individual congressional campaigns, offering advice and suggestions to candidates and their staffs in each race.
 The other organization (the "Independent Expenditure" campaign), which makes independent expenditures in congressional districts on behalf of the campaigns, is not allowed to coordinate activities with the campaigns.

In recent elections, the DCCC has played an expansive role in supporting Democratic candidates with independently produced television ads and mail pieces.

Rahm Emanuel assumed the position of DCCC committee chair after the death of the previous chair, Bob Matsui, at the end of the 2004 election cycle. Emanuel led the Democratic Party's successful effort to capture the majority in the House of Representatives in the 2006 elections. After Emanuel's election as chair of the Democratic Caucus, Chris Van Hollen became committee chair for the 110th Congress and the 2008 elections. He continued through the 2010 elections. For the 2014 election cycle, Democratic Minority Leader Nancy Pelosi appointed congressman Ben Ray Luján to serve as the committee's chair.

In 2022, workers at the DCCC announced they were forming a union affiliated with the Teamsters.

Controversy

Consultant blacklist 
After Alexandria Ocasio-Cortez won her upset congressional victory over Joe Crowley, the DCCC implemented a policy blacklisting consultants who worked for primary opponents of Democratic Party incumbents. Highly unpopular among progressives, the organization rolled back the policy in 2021.

Primary preferences 
In the 2018 election cycle, the DCCC released negative information about candidate Laura Moser, who ran for US Congress in Texas' 7th congressional district. The move backfired, as Moser gained donations and support en route to making the runoff before falling short against Lizzie Fletcher. A month after the attack on Moser, the DCCC showed preference in another Texas primary, supporting Colin Allred. The decisions were two among many similar choices made by the organization throughout its history. Similar criticism carried into the next election cycle, prompting Progressive Caucus member Ro Khanna to say:

This unprecedented grab of power is a slap in the face of Democratic voters across the nation. It’s something even Rahm Emanuel would not have done and is totally tone-deaf to the grassroots activists across our nation. Voters are sick of the status quo holding on to power and stifling new voices. They are sick of D.C. politicians who care more about holding on to power than a true competition of ideas."

Russian hacking 
In July 2016, the DCCC said it was hacked. Subsequently, a person described as a hacker and known as "Guccifer 2.0" (Russian Main Intelligence Directorate persona) reportedly released documents and information that were obtained from the cyberattack on the DCCC.

Supporting election deniers 
In the 2022 primary cycle, the DCCC assisted Republican candidates that supported the claim that the 2020 election was stolen from Donald Trump. This assistance took the form of attack ads aired during Republican primaries, the content of which ostensibly decried the further-right candidate’s election denialism and other views described as “dangerous,” with the aim of making that candidate more appealing to Republican primary voters. It was hoped that those more extreme Republican candidates would be more vulnerable to defeat in the subsequent general election. For instance, in Michigan, they aired ads supposedly “against” John Gibbs, a far-right challenger to incumbent Peter Meijer, who had voted to impeach Donald Trump in the second impeachment. Gibbs ultimately lost in the general election to Democratic candidate Hillary Scholten.

List of chairs

See also 
 Democratic National Committee
 Democratic Senatorial Campaign Committee
 National Republican Congressional Committee
 National Republican Senatorial Committee

Notes

References

External links 
 

Congressional Campaign Committee
Factions in the Democratic Party (United States)
Hill committees